Hugh Rose may refer to:
Hugh Rose, 15th of Kilravock, Scottish politician , one of the Scottish representatives to the first Parliament of Great Britain 
Hugh Rose, 16th of Kilravock, Scottish politician, son of the above, MP for Ross-shire (UK Parliament constituency)
Hugh Rose, 20th of Kilravock, Scottish politician, descendant of the above, MP for Nairnshire (UK Parliament constituency)
Hugh Rose, 24th of Kilravock, British soldier who became Commander of the 1st Battalion, Black Watch
Hugh James Rose (1795–1838), English churchman and theologian
Hugh Rose, 1st Baron Strathnairn (1801–1885), British field-marshal
Sir Michael Rose (British Army officer) (Hugh Michael Rose, born 1940), retired British Army General
Hugh Rose (rugby)